Saladin Brigade may refer to:

Saladin Ayubi Brigade
Descendants of Saladin Brigade